Freddy Bourgeois (born 23 February 1977 in Revin) is a French retired football forward.

Bourgeois played professionally in Ligue 1 and Ligue 2, and the highlight of his career was helping Valenciennes FC win promotion to Ligue 1 during the 2005–06 season.

After he retired from playing football, Bourgeois coached youth football in his native Ardennes.

References

External links 

1977 births
Living people
French footballers
CS Sedan Ardennes players
AS Cannes players
Valenciennes FC players
Nîmes Olympique players
Dijon FCO players
CSO Amnéville players
Association football forwards